Milak (also Romanized as Mīlak; also known as Lilak) is a village in Shabankareh Rural District, Shabankareh District, Dashtestan County, Bushehr Province, Iran. At the 2011 census, its population was 226, in 63 families.

References 

Populated places in Dashtestan County